Ibrahima Ba (born 23 November 1984) is a Senegalese professional footballer who plays as a midfielder for Limoges FC in the Championnat National 3.

He also played for Istres.

Career
Ba joined Championnat National 3 club Limoges FC on 12 June 2019.

References

External links
 
 
 Topspot Profile 

1984 births
Living people
Association football midfielders
Senegalese footballers
CS Sfaxien players
FC Thun players
Al Hilal SFC players
AS Kasserine players
Stade Tunisien players
FC Istres players
AC Arlésien players
A.F.C. Tubize players
Limoges FC players
Swiss Super League players
Ligue 2 players
Championnat National players
Challenger Pro League players
Saudi Professional League players
Senegal international footballers
Senegalese expatriate footballers
Expatriate footballers in Belgium
Senegalese expatriate sportspeople in Belgium
Expatriate footballers in France
Senegalese expatriate sportspeople in France
Expatriate footballers in Switzerland
Expatriate footballers in Tunisia
Expatriate footballers in Saudi Arabia